Synhamitermes is a genus of termite. Species in this genus are nocturnal. The genus has a highly abnormal distribution in India.

Species 

 Synhamitermes ceylonicus
 Synhamitermes colombensis
 Synhamitermes labioangulatus
 Synhamitermes quadriceps

References 

Termites
Insects of India